The Children of the Corn film series began with Children of the Corn, released in 1984 by New World Pictures. After the release of Children of the Corn II: The Final Sacrifice (1992) and the series' acquisition by Dimension Films, the subsequent installments were released directly to video, and bore little to no narrative continuity, beginning with Children of the Corn III: Urban Harvest (1995). In 2009, a second adaptation of the short story aired on the Syfy network, via Fox 21 Television. A third adaptation of the short story titled Children of the Corn (2020), was released on October 23, 2020.

Films

Short film

Cast and crew

Principal cast
 A  indicates the actor or actress lent only his or her voice for his or her film character.
 A  indicates a cameo appearance.
 A dark gray cell indicates the character was not in the film.

Production

Development
Based on the short story by Stephen King, the first Children of the Corn film follows a couple who are besieged by mysterious children in a small town called Gatlin, Nebraska. Its first sequel begins immediately after the events of the original, and focuses on a reporter and his son who are investigating the events of the first film.

Beginning with the third installment, Dimension elected to produce standalone films that were not necessarily narratively connected. The third film follows two brothers from Gatlin who are forced into foster care in Chicago; the younger brother, under the influence of He Who Walks Behind the Rows, begins to grow corn in an abandoned lot behind his new family home, wreaking havoc. The fourth film returns to a rural Nebraska town where a young medical student attempts to uncover a mysterious illness striking the children of her hometown; the fifth film follows a group of young people who encounter the children, led by a man, Ezekiel, of He Who Walks Behind the Rows, when staying overnight in an abandoned farmhouse.

Part six follows a woman, born of the cult from the first film, who returns to Gatlin to uncover the identity of her birth mother, while the seventh installment focuses on a woman who travels to a small town outside Omaha to investigate the disappearance of her grandmother; there, she encounters bizarre children in the fields surrounding her grandmother's apartment building.

The 2009 remake follows the general plot of the first film, focusing on a couple who encounter the children in Gatlin. The ninth film, Genesis, follows a couple who lodge with a mysterious preacher in the California desert, who appears to be leading a bizarre cult.

Releases
The first Children of the Corn (1984) was distributed by New World Pictures, receiving a theatrical release in the spring 1984. Its sequel, The Final Sacrifice (1992), was acquired for distribution by Miramax, and was released theatrically in January 1992 under Miramax's Dimension Films division.

After Dimension's release of Children of the Corn II: The Final Sacrifice, the company would acquire rights to the series and would release numerous follow-up sequels directly to video, beginning with Children of the Corn III: Urban Harvest, released in 1995. After the release of Revelation in 2001, a television remake of the original film was commissioned by Dimension, but ultimately distributed via Fox 21 Television Studios, airing on the Syfy channel in 2009.

In 2011, the ninth installment, Genesis, was released direct-to-video under Dimension's Extreme label.

Box office performance

Home media
The entire series has been released on various home media formats. While all ten of the films have been released on DVD, only the first seven films were released on VHS before the format was phased out. Additionally, Children of the Corn (1984), Children of the Corn III: Urban Harvest, Children of the Corn V: Fields of Terror, Children of the Corn 666: Isaac's Return and Children of the Corn: Genesis have been made available on Blu-ray disc.

See also
 List of Dimension Films films

References

Works cited

External links 
 Children of the Corn I, II, III, IV, V, VI, VII, VIII, IX, 1st Remake, New adaptation, at the Internet Movie Database.

American supernatural horror films
Film series introduced in 1984
Lionsgate franchises